This is a geographically sorted list of national and subnational government agencies focusing on occupational safety and health.  Subnational agencies are indented and listed after the corresponding national agencies.

Africa
 National Institute for Occupational Health (South Africa)
 Occupational Safety and Health Authority (Tanzania)
 Directorate of Occupational Safety and Health Services (Kenya)

Asia
 State Administration of Work Safety (China)
 National Institute of Occupational Safety and Health (Malaysia)
 National Occupational Safety and Health (OSH) Profile (India)
 Korea Occupational Safety and Health Agency
 National Institute of Occupational Safety and Health (Sri Lanka)

Europe
 European Agency for Safety and Health at Work
 Scientific Committee on Occupational Exposure Limit Values (European Union)
 Finnish Institute of Occupational Health
 Federal Institute for Occupational Safety and Health (Germany)
 Health and Safety Authority (Ireland)
 National Institute of Occupational Health (Norway)
 Swedish Work Environment Authority

United Kingdom 
 Health and Safety Executive
 Office for Nuclear Regulation
 Health and Safety Commission (defunct)
 Her Majesty's Railway Inspectorate (defunct)
 Health and Safety Executive for Northern Ireland

North America
 Canadian Centre for Occupational Health and Safety
 WorkSafeBC
 Workplace Safety & Insurance Board (Ontario)

United States

Federal
 U.S. Chemical Safety and Hazard Investigation Board
 National Advisory Committee on Occupational Safety and Health
 National Institute for Occupational Safety and Health
 Navy Occupational Safety & Health
 Mine Safety and Health Administration
 Occupational Safety and Health Administration
 Occupational Safety and Health Review Commission

State
California Occupational Safety and Health Administration
Michigan Occupational Safety and Health Administration
Oregon Occupational Safety and Health Division
Washington State Industrial Safety and Health Administration

Oceania
 National Offshore Petroleum Safety and Environmental Management Authority (Australia)
 National Offshore Petroleum Safety Authority (Australia; defunct)
 Safe Work Australia
 Worksafe (Western Australia)
 WorkSafe Victoria
 WorkSafe New Zealand

References

External links 
 International Labour Organization: country profiles on occupational safety and health

Government health agencies
Occupational safety and health
Occupational safety